Tooling may refer to:
 Machine tools and the tooling, such as cutting tools, fixtures, and accessories, that is used on them
 Cutting tool (machining), any of hundreds of kinds of cutters
 Fixture (tool), a fixed workholding or support device
 Jig (tool), a movable workholding or support device
 Tool management, keeping track of, and maximizing efficient use of, all the tooling
 Tooling University, a training program of SME (society) that teaches machinists about machine tools and tooling
 Agile tooling, the process of using modular means to design tooling that is produced by additive manufacturing or 3D printing methods to enable quick prototyping and responses to tooling and fixture needs
 Programming tools, a set of apps that supports software development

See also
 Re-tooling (disambiguation)
 Tool (disambiguation)